Saint-Gilbert is a parish municipality in the Portneuf Regional County Municipality in the Capitale-Nationale region of Quebec, Canada. It has the smallest population of all municipalities in Portneuf RCM (other than unorganized territories).

Demographics 

Population trend:
 Population in 2011: 282 (2006 to 2011 population change: -3.4%)
 Population in 2006: 292
 Population in 2001: 294
 Population in 1996: 323
 Population in 1991: 315

Mother tongue:
 English as first language: 0%
 French as first language: 100%
 English and French as first language: 0%
 Other as first language: 0%

References

External links

Incorporated places in Capitale-Nationale
Parish municipalities in Quebec